Ry-Krisp is an American brand of rye crisp bread that was introduced in 1899. Based in Minneapolis, Minnesota, the Ry-Krisp plant was purchased by Ralston Purina in 1926. In 1994, the Ralston portion of Ralston Purina was spun off into a new company called Ralcorp Holdings, including the RyKrisp operations. Ralcorp was acquired by ConAgra Foods in 2013.

In January 2015 ConAgra Foods announced that the factory that produces RyKrisp would be closed and the product would be discontinued due to declining demand.  RyKrisp Inc. bought the brand in April 2015 with plans to revitalize it once a new manufacturing partner is found.  A larger-scale commercialization was planned for October 2015 with commercial production expected some time after that. As of fall 2018 production did not start. The owners of the RyKrisp brand gave legal issues as a reason.

In October 2019 the Ry-Krisp owners wrote that their "attorneys succeeded in securing an $8.3 million verdict from a Cook County jury in favor of Firm client RyKrisp, LLC in a dispute between the rye cracker producer and (its contract manufacturer). ... The judgment ensures that RyKrisp will recover damages and lost profits following (the) conversion of RyKrisp's equipment and tortious efforts to interfere with RyKrisp's business." On December 12, 2020 they indicated that litigation continues.

See also

 List of crackers
 Ryvita

References

External links
 Official Ry-Krisp website
 MNopedia.org: Ry-Krisp entry — the Minnesota Encyclopedia.

Crackers (food)
Brand name crackers
American companies established in 1899
Food and drink companies established in 1899
1899 establishments in Minnesota
Conagra Brands brands
Ralston Purina products
American brands